The Indiana State Prison is a maximum security Indiana Department of Correction prison for adult males; however, minimum security housing also exists on the confines. The average daily inmate population in November 2006 was 2,200, 2,165 in 2011. The Indiana State Prison was established in 1860. It was the second state prison in Indiana. One of the most famous prisoners to be in the Michigan City prison was bank robber John Dillinger, who was released on parole in 1933.

The prison houses all the male death row inmates in the state. It appeared in the ITV documentary Inside Death Row with Trevor McDonald.

History

The history of the Indiana State Prison dates back to 1859 when the state legislature granted $50,000 for a new state prison. It was named "State Prison West"; as opposed to "State Prison East" which was the first state prison located in Jeffersonville, Indiana (and later moved to nearby Clarksville). The prison space at Jeffersonville became too scarce, calling for a new prison to be built in Michigan City. Later, State Prison South became the Indiana Reformatory and State Prison North became known as Indiana State Prison.

In 1860,  in Michigan City were purchased for $4,500. The first warden, Charles Seely, was the superintendent in charge of construction and was the general handyman. A year after Michigan City Prison opened, prison labor outside of the institution started; inmates were employed at a cooperage firm making barrels, receiving 38 cents a day. The first prison school was started in 1861 where prisoners would learn from the chaplain five days a week. Later the prison started charging 25 cents per visitor to boost prison revenue.

At the turn of the century, the prison was increased to twice its size. By 1930 prisoners were placed in two cell houses that contained 230 and 340 cells respectively, and three dormitories, which were considered among the best in the country. During that same time period,  of farmland were in use by the prison on land leased by the state. A hospital was built in 1943 that was almost . In the late 1950s, arguably one of the finest state recreational facilities was opened at the prison.

From 1960 to 1990, only minor renovations were implemented at the State Prison. In 1992, a new type of food door with locking capability for each cell was designed. A year later, the first hot meal was served in the dining room, and in that same year, the inmates received three meals a day for the first time. Soon thereafter, a new riot system was put into effect in Dormitories E and F.

Michigan City is known for having housed two famous inmates during its tenure. John Dillinger spent time in Michigan City from 1929 until he was paroled in 1933. A few months after Dillinger made parole, on September 26, ten inmates, including Harry Pierpont, Charles Makley, Russell Lee Clarke and Ed Shouse, escaped thanks to the help of three pistols Dillinger had smuggled into the prison.

The other especially famous inmate was D.C. Stephenson. In 1922 Stephenson became one of the most powerful Grand Dragons of the Ku Klux Klan. In 1925 he raped a woman named Madge Oberholtzer. She died a month later from either poison or bite marks from being raped. That same year he was convicted of second degree murder and was sent to the Indiana State Prison for 31 years.

Michigan City had a cemetery for prisoners when the prison first opened in 1860; however, that cemetery no longer exists. The new prison cemetery in Michigan City has around 350 prisoners buried on the premises. Sam Thomas was the first offender buried in the new cemetery on June 10, 1927.

Before 1913 all executions in Indiana were done by hanging. On February 20, 1914, the first electrocution occurred. From 1913 to 1994 executions were performed via electric chair. Lethal injection has been used in Indiana from 1995 up to the present. Currently all state executions must be carried out in the Indiana State Prison. The prison also has or had a cat adoption program. This program has been exceptionally successful at finding new homes for felines previously owned by prison inmates.

Notable inmates

Current
 William Clyde Gibson – Serial killer convicted of three murders. On death row.

Former
 Howard Allen – Serial killer convicted of three murders. Formerly on death row; sentence commuted. Died of natural causes in 2020.

Executed
 Steven Timothy Judy – Executed March 9, 1981, via electric chair. The first person executed in Indiana since the reinstatement of the death penalty.
 Alan Matheney – Executed September 28, 2005, via lethal injection.
 Matthew Eric Wrinkles – Executed December 11, 2009, via lethal injection. Currently the last person executed in Indiana.

References

Further reading 

A History of the Indiana State Prison: 1860-1910, by William G. Hinkle, Mellen Press, 2020

External links

Profile of Indiana State Prison at Indiana's official website

Michigan City, Indiana
Prisons in Indiana
Capital punishment in the United States
Buildings and structures in LaPorte County, Indiana
Execution sites in the United States
1860 establishments in Indiana